TKS 49ers (Teltow-Kleinmachnow-Stahnsdorf) is a German professional basketball team located at the southwest border of Berlin. The team competes in Germany's ProB league.
Because of its proximity to Berlin, the club has cooperations with the Berlin clubs Tus Lichterfelde and DBV Charlottenburg.

Head coaches

Notable players
- Set a club record or won an individual award as a professional player.
- Played at least one official international match for his senior national team at any time.
  Georgi Boyanov
  Karolis Babkauskas
  Kenneth Cooper
  Terry Evans
  Jeff Harper
  Mike Holton Jr.

References

External links
Presentation at league website

Basketball teams established in 1982
Potsdam-Mittelmark
Sport in Brandenburg